The 2017–18 season was Ergotelis' 88th season in existence and eleventh overall in the Football League, the second tier of the Greek football league system. It was the first season of the club in the competition since the club's latest promotion as champions of the 2016–17 Gamma Ethniki Group 4, and the first season under the ownership of Egyptian businessman Maged Samy. The content of this article covers club activities from 1 July 2017 until 31 May 2018.

After hiring controversial Greek manager Takis Gonias in August 2017, the team struggled early on to earn points on the Table and became relegation contenders at an early stage during the tournament. Ergotelis' squad significantly improved and maintained an impressive good form during the Second Round of the competition, winning several key matches, scoring many goals, maintaining ball possession rates close to 60%-70% and eventually battling their way out of the relegation zone, mainly due to the impressive 22-goal season performance of arriving Belgian striker Hugo Cuypers.

The club also participated in the Greek Cup for the first time since its relegation to the Gamma Ethniki, exiting the competition during the Group Stage having suffered three consecutive losses.

Players

The following players have departed in mid-season 

Note: Flags indicate national team as has been defined under FIFA eligibility rules. Players and Managers may hold more than one non-FIFA nationality.

Transfers

In

Promoted from youth system 

Total spending:  Undisclosed

Out 

Total income:  €0.0

Expenditure:  Undisclosed

Managerial changes

Kit 
2017–February 2018

|
|February – May

|
|Friendlies

|

Pre-season and friendlies

Pre-season friendlies

Mid-season friendlies 

1. 70-minute friendly.

Competitions

Overview 

Last updated: 25 May 2018

Football League Greece

League table

Results summary

Results by Round

Matches 

1. Matchdays 11 and 28 vs. Acharnaikos were awarded to Ergotelis (3−0), due to Acharnaikos being expelled from the league.

2. Matchday 29 vs. Veria was awarded to Ergotelis (3−0), due to Veria having withdrawn from the league.

Greek Cup

Group stage

Group F

Matches

Statistics

Squad statistics 

! colspan="9" style="background:#DCDCDC; text-align:center" | Goalkeepers
|-

! colspan="9" style="background:#DCDCDC; text-align:center" | Defenders
|-

! colspan="9" style="background:#DCDCDC; text-align:center" | Midfielders
|-

! colspan="9" style="background:#DCDCDC; text-align:center" | Forwards
|-

! colspan="9" style="background:#DCDCDC; text-align:center" | Players transferred/loaned out during the season
|-

|}

Goal scorers 

Last updated: 25 May 2018
Source: Competitive matches

Disciplinary record 

Last updated: 25 May 2018
Source: Competitive matches
 = Number of bookings;  = Number of sending offs after a second yellow card;  = Number of sending offs by a direct red card.

Injury record

References 

Ergotelis
Ergotelis F.C. seasons